Lieutenant General John Cameron,  (31 March 1817 – 30 June 1878) was a senior British Army officer who served as executive officer and director-general of the Ordnance Survey.

Cameron was son of Lieutenant General Sir John Cameron, and brother to General Sir Duncan Alexander Cameron.

Cameron was awarded the Fellowship of the Royal Society on 4 June 1868.

References

wikisource
s:Author:John Cameron (1817-1878)

report of death
s:The Hampshire Advertiser/1878/Death of Lieutenant-General Cameron

funeral
s:The Hampshire Advertiser/1878/Funeral of Lieutenant-General Cameron

1817 births
1878 deaths
British Army lieutenant generals
Companions of the Order of the Bath
Fellows of the Royal Society
Royal Engineers officers
Burials at Southampton Old Cemetery